James H. Lincoln (August 26, 1916 – July 23, 2011) was a Detroit City councilman, Juvenile Justice Court judge, and author residing in Harbor Beach, Michigan.

Life and career 
James H. Lincoln was born and raised in the community of Harbor Beach, Michigan.  In 1938, he graduated from the University of Michigan where he played football, and went on to obtain a Juris Doctor degree from the Detroit College of Law in 1943.  In 1953, Lincoln made an unsuccessful run for mayor of Detroit, ultimately losing to incumbent Albert Cobo.  He was elected to a seat on the Detroit City Council in 1954 and retained his position until 1960, when he was appointed a probate court judge by Michigan governor G. Mennen Williams.  He was later assigned to be a juvenile court judge where he served until 1977.  From 1971 to 1972, Lincoln served as the president of National Council of Juvenile and Family Court Judges.  Following his retirement, Wayne County named the James H. Lincoln Juvenile Justice Hall in his honor.  Lincoln died in his home on Lake Huron on July 23, 2011.

Books 
 The Anatomy of a Riot: A Detroit Judge's Report
 ''Fiery Trial

References

External links 
 James H. Lincoln Papers  1916-2001
 

1916 births
2011 deaths
American legal writers
Detroit City Council members
Detroit College of Law alumni
Michigan state court judges
Michigan Wolverines football players
People from Harbor Beach, Michigan
20th-century American judges